Leonardo (A 5301) is a coastal research vessel owned by NATO and operated by the Italian Navy on behalf of the Centre for Maritime Research and Experimentation Her homeport is La Spezia, Italy.

History 

Leonardo was delivered to the NATO Underwater Research Centre - NURC (SACLANTCEN) on 30 April 2002 and was accorded the flag of a public vessel of the Republic of Italy under a 2001 Memorandum of Understanding between the Italian Ministry of Defence (MOD-IT) and the Supreme Allied Commander Atlantic.

On 16 November 2009, CRV Leonardo was transferred to the Italian Navy. She holds the status of an auxiliary of the Italian Navy and is manned by a military crew. The NATO Underwater Research Centre - NURC is now named the Centre for Maritime Research and Experimentation and is based in La Spezia, and specialises in research in acoustic and environmental fields.

Characteristics  
Source 

 scientific primary working area (aft): 
 scientific main laboratory: 
 capacity to carry a single ISO 1D standard, container
 multibeam echo-sounder Simrad EM-3000
Communication systems:
 Main GMDSS MF/HF transceiver Sailor HC 4500
 deck VHF transceiver Sailor RT 4722
 GMDSS SARTS transmitter Jotron 8 GHz
 Prodel UHF transmitter ICOM IC 4088SR

References

External links 

 Leonardo (A 5301) Marina Militare website

Auxiliary ships of the Italian Navy
2002 ships
Ships built in England
Research vessels